This is the list of The Late Show with Stephen Colbert episodes that aired in 2022.

The episode scheduled for April 21, 2022 was cancelled due to Colbert's having tested positive for COVID-19. Jason Bateman and Laura Linney of Ozark, and Matt Walsh of Veep were scheduled to be guests. The next live show was not scheduled to occur until May 2. On May 9, the show announced that new episodes would not be taped until further notice, after Colbert experienced symptoms consistent with a recurrence of COVID. On July 22, the show introduced its first-ever slate of musical residencies, with St. Vincent, James Taylor and Joe Walsh announced as the inaugural artists who will join, starting on July 25.

2022

January

February

March

April

May

June

July

August

September

October

November

December

References

External links
 
 Lineups at Interbridge 
 

Episodes 2022
Lists of American non-fiction television series episodes
Lists of variety television series episodes
Late Show with Stephen Colbert